The following is a list of football stadiums that are in regular use for official matches in Armenia. The minimum capacity is 1,000.

Other stadiums

See also
List of European stadiums by capacity
List of association football stadiums by capacity

Armenia
stadiums
Football stadiums